Spatula is a genus or subgenus of ducks in the family Anatidae that includes the shovelers, garganey, and several species of American teals.

Taxonomy
The species now placed in this genus were formerly placed in the genus Anas. A molecular phylogenetic study comparing mitochondrial DNA sequences published in 2009 found that the genus Anas, as then defined, was non-monophyletic. Based on this published phylogeny, the genus Anas was split into four monophyletic genera with 10 species moved into the resurrected genus Spatula.

The genus Spatula had originally been proposed by the German zoologist Friedrich Boie in 1822. The type species is the northern shoveler.  The name Spatula is the Latin word for "spoon", from which the English word "spatula" also originates.

Extant species
The genus contains 10 species:

Phylogeny
Cladogram based on the analysis of Gonzalez and colleagues published in 2009.

References

 
Bird genera
Taxa named by Friedrich Boie